H.N.I.C. is the debut solo album by American rapper Prodigy. The album was scheduled for a September release, but ultimately released November 14, 2000.

After four Mobb Deep albums, Prodigy took a temporary break from the group and released his first solo effort. "H.N.I.C." is an initialism for "Head Nigga in Charge." Prodigy enlisted a number of producers for the album, including The Alchemist, EZ Elpee, Rockwilder, Just Blaze and his Mobb Deep partner Havoc. Music videos were done for "Keep It Thoro" and "Y.B.E" (Young Black Entrepreneurs). The album received widespread critical acclaim. The song "Keep It Thoro" was released on vinyl.

A sequel, H.N.I.C. Pt. 2 was released April 22, 2008. It features production by Havoc, a fellow member of Mobb Deep and The Alchemist among others. In 2011, after being released from prison, Prodigy began work on the third album in the series, H.N.I.C. 3. The album inspired rapper, Wiz Khalifa's album, O.N.I.F.C. The album was certified Gold by the RIAA on December 18, 2000.

The album also inspired a 16-year-old, Kendrick Lamar, who dropped his Y.H.N.I.C. project in 2003.

Background 
While Prodigy was working on H.N.I.C. and the Murda Muzik album with Mobb Deep, he started living a healthy lifestyle. His verse on "Quiet Storm" explains this:

"I spent too many nights sniffin' coke, gettin' right wastin' my life, now I'm trying to make things right."

Although Quiet Storm appeared on Murda Muzik, it was originally planned for H.N.I.C. Prodigy addresses his lifelong experience with Sickle-cell disease on the track "You Can Never Feel My Pain." On this track he also explains that this disease makes him depressed, which made him crave for controlled substances and alcohol.

A further example of this conscious writing style is visible in the lyrics of the song "Genesis."

"The positive and negative war has now begun. P helps you separate both the sides let the truth arise, black devil doesn't hide You can't hide from me, you might from the others. I've been employed to pull your ass out from the covers. You walk like you got hooves and talk like you 'sposed to. Trickin my brothers into followin you? Yo, Potential energy is easily made kinetic."

The album is not strictly conscious, though. The album also contains songs with hardcore lyrics. Prodigy can therefore be described as a 'conscious gangster'.

On the track H.N.I.C, Prodigy lets you know that he is the boss:

"I be the H.N.I.C. The head nigga in charge. The boss, the Captain Crunch dog, the sarge. The M.O.B.B., the status - we large. The guns, the drama, the love, the Mobb."

The 6th track "Keep It Thoro" does not have a hook or chorus; this was the central idea of the song, with Prodigy making this clear with the penultimate line "heavy airplay all day with no chorus." However, Prodigy's manager at the time, Chris Lighty, thought the song could do better on the radio with a chorus. This then led to the recording of a version with a chorus by Havoc after the album was released, with the penultimate line edited out. The Alchemist, the producer of this track, later commented that "the hook was dope too but the song was already powerful enough." This version of the song was included on the Japanese edition of the album as a bonus track.

Prodigy's wife KiKi appears on the track "Trials of Love" as B.K. (aka) Mz. Bars, the only time she appears on a song. She made her video appearance in the Hey Luv video from Mobb Deep's Infamy (2001).

The album appeared on "The 100 Best Albums of the 2000s" list by Complex magazine.

Track listing

Charts

Certifications

References 

2000 debut albums
Prodigy (rapper) albums
Loud Records albums
Albums produced by the Alchemist (musician)
Albums produced by Rockwilder
Albums produced by Just Blaze
Albums produced by Bink (record producer)